Diplostamenides is a genus which belongs to the family Microcotylidae and class Monogenea.  As all Monogenea, species of Atriostella are ectoparasites that affect their host by attaching themselves as larvae on the gills of the fish and grow into adult stage. This larval stage is called oncomiracidium, and is characterized as free swimming and ciliated.

Members of the genus Diplostamenides are characterised by a genital atrium armed with a corona of graded spines and relatively few, usually much stouter spines on head of the penis.

Species
According to the World Register of Marine Species, 8 species have been attached to this genus:

References

Microcotylidae
Monogenea genera